Ents are a species of beings in J. R. R. Tolkien's fantasy world Middle-earth who closely resemble trees; their leader is Treebeard of Fangorn forest. Their name is derived from an Old English word for "giant".

The Ents appear in The Lord of the Rings as ancient shepherds of the forest and allies of the free peoples of Middle-earth during the War of the Ring. The Ent who figures most prominently in the book is Treebeard, who is called the oldest creature in Middle-earth (a description also given to Tom Bombadil). At the time of the War of the Ring, there are no young Ents (Entings) because the Entwives (female Ents) were lost. Akin to Ents are Huorns, whom Treebeard describes as a transitional form of trees which become animated or, conversely, as Ents who grow more "treelike" over time.

Inspired by Tolkien and similar traditions, animated or anthropomorphic tree creatures appear in a variety of media and works of fantasy.

Etymology

The word "Ent" was taken from the Old English ent or eoten, meaning "giant". Tolkien borrowed the word from a phrase in the Anglo-Saxon poems The Ruin and Maxims II, orþanc enta geweorc ("cunning work of giants"), which describes Roman ruins.

In Sindarin, one of Tolkien's invented Elvish languages, the word for Ent is Onod (plural Enyd). Sindarin Onodrim means the Ents as a race.

Internal history

Description

Ents vary widely in personal traits (height, heft, colouring, even the number of digits), having come to resemble somewhat the specific types of trees that they shepherded. Quickbeam, for example, guarded rowan trees and bore some resemblance to rowans: tall and slender, smooth-skinned, with ruddy lips and grey-green hair. Some Ents, such as Treebeard, were like

Ents share some of the strengths and weaknesses of trees. Their skin is extraordinarily tough, and very much like wood; they can erode stone extremely rapidly, in the manner of tree roots, but they are vulnerable to fire and chopping blows from axes. Ents are an extremely patient and cautious race, with a sense of time more suited to trees than to short-lived mortals. For example, in the Entmoot regarding the attack on Isengard, some of them considered their three-day deliberation to be "hasty".

Ents are tall and very strong, capable of tearing apart rock and stone (though they use their full strength only when they are "roused"). Tolkien describes them as tossing great slabs of stone about, and ripping down the walls of Isengard "like bread-crust". Treebeard boasted of their strength to Merry and Pippin; he said that Ents were much more powerful than Trolls, which Morgoth made in the First Age in mockery of Ents, as orcs were of elves. The book further lays out the power of Ents; their bark-like skin and flesh make them difficult to harm even with axes, and a single punch from an Ent can kill; although they do hurl stones, they use no other weapons.

First Age

Almost nothing is known of the early history of the Ents. After the Dwarves were put to sleep by Eru to await the coming of the Elves, the Vala Aulë told his wife Yavanna, "the lover of all things that grow in the earth," of the Dwarves. She replied, "They will delve in the earth, and the things that grow and live upon the earth they will not heed. Many a tree shall feel the bite of their iron without pity." She went to Manwë and appealed to him to protect the trees, and they realized that Ents, too, were part of the Song of Creation. Yavanna then warned Aulë, "Now let thy children beware! For there shall walk a power in the forests whose wrath they will arouse at their peril." The Ents are called "the Shepherds of the Trees". Much later, when Beren and a force of Green Elves waylay the force of Dwarves returning from the sack of Doriath, the Dwarves are routed and scatter into the wood, where the Shepherds of the Trees ensure that none escape.

Although the Ents were sentient beings from the time of their awakening, they did not know how to speak until the Elves taught them. Treebeard said that the Elves "cured us of dumbness", calling that a great gift that could not be forgotten. ("They always wished to talk to everything, the old Elves did.") In the Third Age of Middle-earth, the forest of Fangorn was the only place still inhabited by Ents.

Treebeard tells of a time when much of Eriador was forested and part of his domain, but these immense forests dwindled over time. Treebeard's statement is corroborated by Elrond: "Time was when a squirrel could go from tree to tree from what is now the Shire to Dunland west of Isengard." Of this vast forest, according to Treebeard, Fangorn forest was "just the East End".

Entwives

Treebeard says that the Entwives began to move farther away from the Ents because they liked to plant and control things, while the Ents preferred forests and liked to let things take their natural course. The Entwives moved away to the region that would later become the Brown Lands across the Great River Anduin, although the male Ents still visited them. The Entwives, unlike the Ents, interacted with the race of Men and taught them much about the art of agriculture. The Entwives lived in peace until their gardens were destroyed by Sauron, whereupon the Entwives themselves disappeared. The Ents looked for them but never found them. It was sung by the Elves (as the Ents were content simply to "chant their beautiful names") that one day the Ents and Entwives would find each other. Indeed, in The Return of the King, Treebeard implored the Hobbits not to forget to send word to him if they "hear any news" of the Entwives "in your land".

In The Fellowship of the Ring, Samwise Gamgee mentions that his cousin Hal claims to have seen a treelike giant, which resembled an elm not only in size but also in actual appearance, in the north of the Shire. During the Fangorn episode, Merry and Pippin told Treebeard about the Shire. Treebeard said that the Entwives would have liked that land. This, combined with the giant-sighting by Sam's cousin Hal mentioned above, has led to some speculation by readers that the Entwives may have lived near the Shire. Tolkien himself spent much time considering what actually happened to the Entwives (at one point saying that even he did not know), but eventually he stated in Letters #144: "I think that in fact the Entwives have disappeared for good, being destroyed with their gardens in the War of the Last Alliance...some may have fled east, or even have become enslaved..."

At the end of the story after Aragorn is crowned king, he promised Treebeard that the Ents could prosper again and spread to new lands with the threat of Mordor gone, and renew their search for the Entwives.
However, Treebeard lamented that forests may spread but the Ents would not, and he predicted that the few remaining Ents would remain in Fangorn forest until they slowly dwindled in number or became "treeish", saying: "Sheep get like shepherds, and shepherds get like sheep. [...] But it is quicker and closer, with trees and Ents."

The Last March of the Ents

In The Two Towers, the second volume of Tolkien's The Lord of the Rings, the Ents – usually a very patient, deliberate people – become roused with their long simmering anger at Saruman, whose armies are cutting down large numbers of their trees. They convene an Entmoot, a meeting of the Ents of Fangorn forest at Derndingle.

After lengthy deliberation (three days; though from the perspective of the Ents this was almost no time at all), they march on Saruman's fortress at Isengard - 'the last march of the Ents'. Led by Treebeard, the oldest Ent, and accompanied by the hobbits Meriadoc Brandybuck and Peregrin Took, the Ents numbered about 50, plus an army of Huorns. They destroy Isengard, tearing down the wall around it: "If the Great Sea had risen in wrath and fallen on the hills with storm, it could have worked no greater ruin". Saruman is trapped in the tower of Orthanc.

Tolkien noted in a letter that he had created Ents in response to his "bitter disappointment and disgust from schooldays with the shabby use made in Shakespeare's Macbeth of the coming of 'Great Birnam Wood to high Dunsinane hill': I longed to devise a setting in which the trees might really march to war". As well as destroying Isengard, Treebeard ensured victory at the Battle of Helm's Deep, in which Saruman tried to destroy Rohan. On the morning after the long night of battle, both armies saw that a forest of angry, tree-like Huorns now filled the valley, trapping Saruman's army of Orcs. The Orcs fled into the Huorn forest and were destroyed. Commentators have observed that this represented a wish-fulfilment on Tolkien's part, concerned as he was with the increasing damage to the English countryside in the 20th century.

Adaptations

Ents in other media

In Peter Jackson's films The Lord of the Rings: The Two Towers (2002) and The Lord of the Rings: The Return of the King (2003), Treebeard is a combination of a large animatronic model and a CGI construct; he is voiced by John Rhys-Davies, who also portrays Gimli. 
The Fall of Troy has a song entitled "The Last March of the Ents" on their self-titled debut album released in 2003.
Permission was granted for a statue of Treebeard by Tim Tolkien, near his great-uncle J. R. R. Tolkien's former home in Moseley, Birmingham.

In popular culture

Ents appeared in the earliest edition of the roleplaying game Dungeons & Dragons in the 1974 white box set, where they were described as tree-like creatures able to command trees, and lawful in nature. In 1975, Elan Merchandising, which owned the game license to the Tolkien estate, issued a cease-and-desist order regarding the use of the word "ent", so the Dungeons & Dragons creatures were renamed "treants". Heroes of Might and Magic III and V include Treants as a part of the Elven alliance; however, in Heroes of Might and Magic V, due to copyright infringement issues, their look was changed between the beta phase and the retail version, making them quadrupedal.
The TV series The Lord of the Rings: The Rings of Power, set in the Second Age, features Ents.

See also 

 List of tree deities
 Sacred trees and groves in Germanic paganism and mythology
 Trees and forests in Middle-earth
 Battle of Droizy

References

Primary 
This list identifies each item's location in Tolkien's writings.

Secondary

Sources

External links

Fictional giants
Fictional trees
Middle-earth races

de:Figuren in Tolkiens Welt#Ents
he:הסילמריליון - גזעים#אנטים - רועי העצים